The United States claimed a number of islands as insular areas under the Guano Islands Act of 1856. Only the eight administered as the US Minor Islands and the ones part of Hawaii and American Samoa remain under the jurisdiction of the United States. Any other unresolved claims, if they exist are dormant, and have not been contested by the United States in many years, with the exception of Navassa.

Table

Images

See also
 Guano
 Insular area
 Territories of the United States
 Pacific Remote Islands Marine National Monument

References

Further reading

 
Guano Islands Act claims
Guano Islands Act claims
Guano Islands Act claims
Law of insular areas of the United States